MERS coronavirus EMC/2012 (MERS coronavirus Erasmus Medical Center/2012) is a strain of coronavirus isolated from the sputum of the first person to become infected with what was later named Middle East respiratory syndrome–related coronavirus (MERS-CoV), a virus that causes Middle East respiratory syndrome (MERS).

Natural reservoir 
An investigation of bat roosts in Bisha, the hometown of the index patient, by the Saudi Ministry of Health discovered an Egyptian tomb bat in a large roost close to the index patient's home. Phylogenetic analysis showed a 100% match between the virus isolated from the bat and MERS coronavirus EMC/2012 isolated from the index patient.

Virology 
MERS coronavirus EMC/2012 is the sixth coronavirus known to infect humans and the first human virus within betacoronavirus lineage C. It is a new genotype which is related to bat coronaviruses, specifically an Egyptian tomb bat, and is not the same beta-CoV as the SARS-CoV, but is distantly related.

See also 
 Novel virus

References 

Merbecovirus
Bat virome
2012 in Saudi Arabia
2013 in Saudi Arabia
Death in Saudi Arabia
Health in Saudi Arabia
Viral respiratory tract infections
Zoonoses
Infraspecific virus taxa